Eggysodontidae is a family of perissodactyls closely related to rhinoceroses. Fossils have been found in Oligocene deposits in Europe, the Caucasus, Central Asia, China, and Mongolia.

Taxonomy
The family Eggysodontidae has been at times considered a subfamily of Hyracodontidae, as Eggysodontinae, by several authors. However, recent analyses have leaned towards recognizing eggysodonts as a distinct family more closely related to crown Rhinocerotoidea than to hyracodonts or paraceratheres.

Biology
Eggysodonts were ground-dwelling browsers, being largely the size of dogs.

References

Oligocene mammals of Europe
Oligocene mammals of Asia
Oligocene rhinoceroses
Prehistoric mammal families